Bahtiyar Yorulmaz (born 12 August 1955) is a Turkish retired professional football player who played as a forward.

Professional career
Yorulmaz was the joint top scorer, or Gol Kralı, for the 1979–80 1.Lig for Bursaspor with 12 goals. Yorulmaz was known for his fiery temperament, and helped Fenerbahçe S.K. win the Süper Lig in 1983.

References

External links
 
 

Living people
1955 births
Sportspeople from Denizli
Turkish footballers
Turkey international footballers
Süper Lig players
TFF First League players
Eskişehirspor footballers
Bursaspor footballers
Fenerbahçe S.K. footballers
Denizlispor footballers
Association football forwards